Fagnano Lake, also called Lake Cami, is a lake located on the main island of the  Tierra del Fuego archipelago, and shared by Argentina and Chile. The 645 km2 lake runs east–west for about 98 kilometres, of which 72.5 km (606 km2) belong to the Argentine Tierra del Fuego Province, and only 13.5 km (39 km2) belong to the Chilean Magallanes y la Antártica Chilena Region. It has a maximum depth of 449 meters. The southern bank is steep compared to the northern, and expands in a considerably wide and flat piedmont from which both levels of the plateaus can be appreciated. From its western end, the Azopardo River drains towards the Almirantazgo Fjord.  On its eastern end is the town of Tolhuin. The lake is located in a pull-apart basin developed along the Magallanes–Fagnano Fault zone.

According to a Selk'nam myth the lake was created alongside the Strait of Magellan and Beagle Channel in places where slingshots fell on earth during Taiyín's fight with a witch who was said to have "retained the waters and the foods".

References

 

Lakes of Argentina
Lakes of Chile
Isla Grande de Tierra del Fuego
Lakes of Magallanes Region
Argentina–Chile border
International lakes of South America
Lakes of Tierra del Fuego Province, Argentina